The Guards Division is an administrative unit of the British Army responsible for the training and administration of the regiments of Foot Guards and the London Guards reserve battalion. The Guards Division is responsible for providing two battalions for public duties to London District (plus three incremental companies); although the guards are most associated with ceremony, they are nevertheless operational infantry battalions, and as such perform all the various roles of infantry.

History
The Guards Division was established by redesignation of the Brigade of Guards in 1968. The headquarters was established at Wellington Barracks in London. 

Before the Options for Change defence review in 1992, there were eight battalions:
1st and 2nd Battalions, Grenadier Guards
1st and 2nd Battalions, Coldstream Guards
1st and 2nd Battalions, Scots Guards
1st Battalion, Irish Guards
1st Battalion, Welsh Guards

The cuts made to the infantry under Options for Change included three battalions of Guards. However, rather than disbanding them, the 2nd Battalions of each of the first three regiments were placed in "suspended animation" – although they would not be active, they would still be listed on the Army Roll, and could be reactivated should they be needed. In order to maintain the traditions of each battalion, and to keep custody of the colours, three companies were kept active, one to represent each battalion:
No 2 Company, 2nd Bn Grenadier Guards (renamed Nijmegen Company)
No 7 Company, 2nd Bn Coldstream Guards
F Company, 2nd Bn Scots Guards

These three units were based permanently at Chelsea Barracks in London on public duties until Chelsea Barracks was sold off by the army. They represent the suspended battalions at significant events, such as Trooping the Colour, and receive the battalion's new colours whenever they are presented. As such, each company is an independent unit of their regiment, separate from the operational battalions. In 2022, two further public duties companies were formed following the conversion of 1st Battalion, Irish Guards to the Security Force Assistance role. The two new companies, No 9 Company and No 12 Company, have been formed to represent the Irish Guards' 2nd Battalion, which was placed in suspended animation in 1947.

Current units
Currently units comprise:
Guards Division Headquarters, at Wellington Barracks, Westminster
1st Battalion, Grenadier Guards
Nijmegen Company, Grenadier Guards 
1st Battalion, Coldstream Guards 
No 7 Company, Coldstream Guards 
1st Battalion, Scots Guards 
F Company, Scots Guards
1st Battalion, Irish Guards
No 9 Company, Irish Guards
No 12 Company, Irish Guards 
1st Battalion, Welsh Guards
1st Battalion, London Guards

Past units
Past units include (dates when they were part of the division):
 2nd Battalion, Grenadier Guards (1968–1994), reduced to Nijmegan Company
 2nd Battalion, Coldstream Guards (1968–1993), reduced to No.7 Company
 2nd Battalion, Scots Guards (1968–1971, reduced to 2 Scots Guards Company in 1st Battalion, re-instated 1972–1993), reduced to F Company
 Band of the Grenadier Guards (1968–1994), transferred to Royal Corps of Army Music (CAMUS) on formation of that corps
 Band of the Coldstream Guards (1968–1994), transferred to CAMUS
 Band of the Scots Guards (1968–1994), transferred to CAMUS
 Band of the Irish Guards (1968–1994), transferred to CAMUS
 Band of the Welsh Guards (1968–1994), transferred to CAMUS
 London Regiment (2017–2022), redesignated as London Guards

Note: The three 2nd battalions have technically not been disbanded; instead they are in "suspended animation" and, in theory, can be re-raised if needed. The colours and traditions of each battalion are kept and maintained by the incremental companies.

Telling the regiments apart 

The five regiments of foot guards are most often seen in full dress uniform, comprising navy trousers, scarlet tunic and bearskin cap. From a distance they appear identical, but there are ways to distinguish between the regiments:
 The colour of the plume, and which side of the bearskin it is worn on
 The spacing of the tunic buttons
 The badge worn on the collar
 The badge worn on the shoulder

Guards Parachute Platoon

6 Platoon, B Company, 3rd Battalion, Parachute Regiment is manned by volunteers from the Guards Division and Household Cavalry

UK Special Forces

Although no longer directly associated with the Guards, G Squadron 22 SAS was formed in 1966 following the performance of the Guards Independent Parachute Company under Major LGS Head in support of SAS Operations in Borneo.

See also 
 Household Cavalry
 Household Division
 King's Troop, Royal Horse Artillery
 Guards Division for the tactical formation active in World War I (and briefly at the end of World War II)
 Guards Armoured Division for the tactical formation active in World War II

List of bands:
 Band of the Grenadier Guards
 Band of the Coldstream Guards
 Band of the Scots Guards
 Band of the Irish Guards
 Band of the Welsh Guards

Notes

References

Sources

External links
 

 
Infantry divisions of the United Kingdom